Giulio Donadio (5 July 1889 – 15 June 1951) was an Italian actor and film director. Donadio appeared in over forty films between 1912 and 1947, including the historical melodrama Red Passport (1935). He also directed several films during the silent era.

Selected filmography
 The Danube Boatman (1914)
 The Bandit of Port Avon (1914)
 Full Speed (1934)
 Villafranca (1934)
 Red Passport (1935)
 A Woman Between Two Worlds (1936)
 The Anonymous Roylott (1936)
 Manon Lescaut (1940)
 Eternal Melodies (1940)
 Inspector Vargas (1940)
 The Happy Ghost (1941)
 Beatrice Cenci (1941)
 L'attore scomparso (1941)
 The Prisoner of Santa Cruz (1941)
 Labbra serrate (1942)
 Life of Donizetti (1947)

References

External links

Bibliography
 Landy, Marcia. The Folklore of Consensus: Theatricality in the Italian Cinema, 1930-1943. SUNY Press, 1998.

1889 births
1951 deaths
Italian film directors
Italian male film actors
Italian male silent film actors
Italian male stage actors
20th-century Italian male actors